Mandurriao is one of the seven districts of Iloilo City, in the province of Iloilo, on the island of Panay, in the Western Visayas region, in the Philippines. It is the second-largest district by land area as well as the third-most populous district, with 62,240 people in the 2020 census. Mandurriao is the site of the developing Iloilo midtown area, where major city developments have been concentrated over the last two decades. It is projected to be the next commercial and financial hub of Iloilo City.

Mandurriao is one of the major commercial areas in Iloilo City, the others being Molo, Jaro, and the City Proper. Aside from being known for many commercials, condominiums, and business process outsourcing (BPO) offices, Mandurriao is also home to many nightlife locations in the city. Smallville Business Complex, along with Riverside Boardwalk, Festive Walk Parade, and City Time Square, are one of the bustling commercial and leisure areas in the district, featuring upscale restaurants, bars, nightclubs, and hotels. Accordingly, the district is sometimes locally referred to as "The District That Never Sleeps".

The first phase of the Iloilo River Esplanade is located in the district, which opened in 2012.

Etymology 
The name Mandurriao was derived from the names of two crocodiles fighting named Mandu and Riao during the exploration of the Spaniards in Iloilo. The names of the crocodiles were originally from two now-defunct lakes also named Mandu and Riao, where the two crocodiles' habitats are, respectively. It later formed in the minds of the people that the place was called Mandurriao. Eventually, the letter "r" in Mandu-Riao was replaced with "rr". For the Spaniards, having an "rr" in a word brought further beauty and character.

History 
Mandurriao was founded in 1726. It was its own municipality before being incorporated into Iloilo City on July 16, 1937, along with the former towns of Arevalo, La Paz, and Molo by virtue of Act No. 719 of 1903. Mandurriao was a residential and agricultural district before it was turned into a business district. It was once known for its fishponds and salt beds, which have now been transformed into an urban development area and have become the city's new commercial district.

Mandurriao Airport period (1937–2007) 

Mandurriao Airport was built in 1937 and has served as the gateway to Iloilo. The airport was also used as a World War II airfield. In the 1990s, the Philippine aviation industry liberalized and air travel increased in the country, and problems at Mandurriao Airport began to emerge, prompting the national government as well as the city and provincial government's agreement to a proposal to build the current Iloilo Airport outside of the city.

Development period 
In 2007, the new airport in Cabatuan, Iloilo opened, leaving the old airport in Mandurriao open for privatization of the property. Megaworld Corporation acquired the 72-hectare site of the old airport for ₱1.2 billion (roughly $2.5 million) to be developed to become Iloilo City's new central business district (CBD), named Iloilo Business Park.

In 2015, the APEC Finance meetings were hosted in the Iloilo Convention Center, which occupies the former site of the airport's passenger terminal (demolished between 2012 and 2013).

Aside from Megaworld Corporation, Ayala Corporation, SM Development Corporation, and Gaisano Group of Companies have also invested in the nearby area within Mandurriao.

Economy 

Mandurriao is the center of trade, commerce, finance, real estate, and business process outsourcing in the city, along with Iloilo City Proper. It is the fastest developing district in Iloilo City. Among the four largest mixed-use development townships in the district are Megaworld Corporation's  Iloilo Business Park; Ayala Land's  Atria Park District; SM Prime Holdings' SM Iloilo Complex; and Gaisano Group of Companies'  Iloilo City Center. South of the Atria Park District is the Smallville Business Complex, Iloilo's nightlife capital and a popular dining and entertainment hub. These townships are adjacent to each other, resulting in the formation of a single large CBD in one area being named Iloilo Midtown CBD (New Iloilo Business Center or Iloilo Business Triangle).

Mandurriao also has the highest concentration of high-rise buildings in Iloilo City. Besides the high structures, it has a remarkable aesthetic and a reputation as the central amusement hub of the metro. Trade and commerce continue to soar in the district. Business Process Outsourcing (BPO) companies, upscale hotels, residential towers, large malls, parks, and offices are sprouting everywhere within the district.

Education 
Mandurriao has several academic institutions. The most notable ones are namely, Ateneo de Iloilo–Santa Maria Catholic School, Iloilo Scholastic Academy, Santa Isabel College of Iloilo City, St. Joseph School, and Mandurriao National High School, among others.

Transportation 
Mandurriao is mostly served by jeepneys and white-metered taxis. Tricycles and trisikads are also being used as transportation within the district for shorter distances. The Aleosan Transport Terminal (Hibao-an Terminal) in Hibao-an Norte, Mandurriao serves routes to central Iloilo towns or ALEOSAN (Alimodian, Leon, San Miguel) towns, vice versa.

In March 2019, the Land Transportation Franchising and Regulatory Board announced the opening of a new Premium Point-to-Point Bus Service in Iloilo City with express bus services from Iloilo Business Park to Iloilo International, Kalibo International, and Caticlan airports in Cabatuan, Kalibo, and Boracay (Caticlan, Malay), respectively.

In addition to Iloilo City's being the Bike Capital of the Philippines, there is also a network of the country's longest protected bike lanes that follows the long stretch of Diversion Road that traverses Mandurriao's new business center. The bike lane stretches from Iloilo Esplanade up to Ungka in Jaro.

Barangays 
The district of Mandurriao is divided into 18 barangays.

See also 
 Iloilo Business Park
 Iloilo River Esplanade
 List of tallest buildings in Iloilo

References

External links 

 Iloilo City Government Official Website
 Iloilo Business Park

Districts of Iloilo City
Former municipalities of the Philippines